Linkerz.lm

The Forum of Free Enterprise s a non-political organization, established to educate public opinion in India on free enterprise and democratic way of life. The Forum publishes booklets and leaflets, organises meetings and essay competitions to further its objects. It was founded in 1956 by industrialist and economist A.D. Shroff and has its office in Mumbai.

References

Organisations based in Mumbai
Think tanks based in India
1956 establishments in Bombay State
Think tanks established in 1956